Susan Knox is a Paralympic swimming competitor from Australia.  She won a bronze medal at the 1988 Seoul Games in the Women's 100 m Backstroke A4 event.

References

Female Paralympic swimmers of Australia
Swimmers at the 1988 Summer Paralympics
Paralympic bronze medalists for Australia
Living people
Medalists at the 1988 Summer Paralympics
Year of birth missing (living people)
Paralympic medalists in swimming
Australian female backstroke swimmers
20th-century Australian women